Dihydrothiophenes are heterocyclic organosulfur compounds. Two isomers are possible for the parent C4H6S:  
 2,3-Dihydrothiophene, a vinyl thioether. CAS RN = 1120-59-8.
 2,5-Dihydrothiophene, an allylic thioether.  A well-known derivative is 2,5-dihydrothiophene 1,1-dioxide.  CAS RN = 1708-32-3.

Depending on the substituents, some dihydrothiophenes are called 4,5-dihydrothiophenes.

References

Sulfur heterocycles